John James Sykes (born 29 July 1959) is an English guitarist, best known as a member of Whitesnake, Thin Lizzy and Tygers of Pan Tang. He has also fronted the hard rock group Blue Murder and released several solo albums.

Following a stint in the heavy metal band Tygers of Pan Tang in the early 1980s, Sykes joined Irish hard rock group Thin Lizzy for their 1983 album Thunder and Lightning. He then joined Whitesnake, with whom he recorded the multi-platinum selling 1987 album. However, Sykes was let go from the band before the record's release under acrimonious circumstances, which led to him forming his own group Blue Murder. After two albums and a live record, he embarked on a solo career. For the remainder of the 1990s and early 2000s, Sykes split his time between his solo career and a reformed Thin Lizzy, which he fronted until 2009, when he left to focus on his solo career.

Influenced by the likes of Jimmy Page, Ritchie Blackmore and Gary Moore, Sykes is known for his distinctive playing style, characterized by his fast alternate picking, use of pinch harmonics, and sense of melody. In 2004, he was included on Guitar Worlds list of "100 Greatest Heavy Metal Guitarists of All Time". In 2006, Gibson released a limited line of John Sykes Signature Les Pauls, which were modelled after his 1978 Gibson Les Paul Custom.

Early life
John James Sykes was born 29 July 1959 in Reading, Berkshire. He first became interested in the guitar at age fourteen, when his uncle showed him how to play some of Eric Clapton's licks. At the time, Sykes and his family were living in Ibiza, Spain, where his father and uncle owned a discothèque. For the next two years, Sykes practiced playing blues songs on an old nylon-string guitar. After three years in Spain, the Sykes family moved back to Reading. There, John entered a relationship and essentially gave up the guitar for a year and half. He didn't start playing again until he moved to Blackpool, when he was asked to join the band Streetfighter by his friend Mervyn Goldsworthy, who would later play bass in Diamond Head, Samson and FM.

Career

Early career 
Sykes began his professional music career when he left Streetfighter to join Tygers of Pan Tang. Sykes recorded two albums with the group, Spellbound and Crazy Nights, which were both released in 1981. By the following year, however, Sykes had grown frustrated with the band, as he and vocalist Jon Deverill would often butt heads with the other members. He would later also state that in his opinion the group lacked both the style and dedication to achieve major success. Sykes eventually left Tygers of Pan Tang two days before the start of a French tour in early 1982. However, he did appear on two tracks on the band's fourth album The Cage, which was released after he had already left the group. 

After leaving Tygers of Pan Tang, Sykes auditioned for Ozzy Osbourne's band and was briefly a member of John Sloman's Badlands. Despite a few shows and Sloman procuring a recording contract with EMI, the band ultimately broke-up after Sykes was approached to join Thin Lizzy.

Thin Lizzy 

After his departure from Tygers of Pan Tang, Sykes was still contractually obligated to deliver a single to the band's record label MCA Records. Through Tygers of Pan Tang producer Chris Tsangarides, Sykes was able to get in touch with Thin Lizzy frontman Phil Lynott. The two co-wrote and performed the single "Please Don't Leave Me", which was released in 1982. The track also featured fellow Thin Lizzy members Brian Downey and Darren Wharton. After finishing the song, Sykes was asked to join Thin Lizzy. He was officially confirmed as the band's new guitarist in September 1982. Sykes performed on the group's 1983 album Thunder and Lightning, for which he also co-wrote the single "Cold Sweat". Sykes's inclusion helped revitalise the band, steering them towards a sound more akin to heavy metal. The supporting tour for Thunder and Lightning was billed as Thin Lizzy's farewell tour, though Sykes and Lynott were eager to continue further. During the tour, the band recorded the live album Life, and Sykes also accompanied Lynott on a European solo tour. Thin Lizzy played their final UK concert at the Reading Festival in August 1983, before finally disbanding after a show at Nuremberg's Monsters of Rock festival on 4 September.

Phil Lynott died on 4 January 1986, aged 36. In 1994, Sykes, along with former Thin Lizzy members Brian Downey, Scott Gorham and Darren Wharton, formed a new touring version of Thin Lizzy, which was presented as a tribute to Phil Lynott's life and work. While the band only performed songs from Thin Lizzy's back catalogue and did not compose any new material, they were still criticised for using the Thin Lizzy name without Lynott being present. In 2000, the group released the live album One Night Only. Sykes continued to front Thin Lizzy through various line-up changes before announcing his own departure in 2009, stating: "I feel it's time to get back to playing my own music." Scott Gorham would later reform Thin Lizzy without Sykes's involvement.

Whitesnake 

After Thin Lizzy's break-up, Sykes was initially keen to continue working with Phil Lynott in what would become Grand Slam. However, he was soon asked to join English hard rock group Whitesnake, whom he had met while on tour with Thin Lizzy. After negotiating a satisfactory contract and receiving Phil Lynott's blessing, Sykes agreed to join Whitesnake. He made his live debut with the group in Dublin on 17 February 1984. He was then tasked with recording new guitar parts for the US release of the band's 1984 album Slide It In. Afterwards, Whitesnake embarked on a lengthy world tour, which culminated in two shows at the 1985 Rock in Rio festival. Slide It In became Whitesnake's first major success in the United States, selling over half a million copies. Sykes played a key role in Whitesnake's newfound success, with a more vibrant look and sound compared to the band's previous guitar players.

Sykes was heavily involved in the making of Whitesnake's next album, co-writing nine songs with vocalist David Coverdale. He began pushing the band towards a more mainstream sound, which Coverdale described as "leaner, meaner and more electrifying". The two began writing together in the South of France in early 1985, before heading to Little Mountain Sound Studios in Vancouver to begin recording. During that time, however, Coverdale's relationship with the rest of the band began to sour with him eventually firing all other members of the group, including Sykes. Whitesnake's seventh album was eventually released in April 1987, and it became the band's most commercially successful album to date, reaching number two on the Billboard 200 chart and selling over eight million copies in the US.

Since leaving Whitesnake, Sykes's relationship with David Coverdale has remained strained, with Sykes admitting he's still "very bitter" about how Coverdale handled his firing. In the early 2000s, there was a "reaching out" between the two as Coverdale was putting together a new Whitesnake line-up. By his own account, Sykes recommended Marco Mendoza and Tommy Aldridge for the band (both of whom would end up joining), after which he never heard from Coverdale again. Conversely, Mendoza claimed to have acted as a mediator of sorts between the two. Coverdale admitted to having spoken to Sykes about a possible reunion, but ultimately felt that the two had been "their own bosses" for too long. In 2017, Sykes said of Coverdale: "I really have no interest in ever talking to him again."

Blue Murder 
Following his dismissal from Whitesnake, Sykes formed Blue Murder, which featured bassist Tony Franklin and drummer Carmine Appice. Initially, drummer Cozy Powell and vocalist Ray Gillen were tapped for the project. Powell eventually left to join Black Sabbath, while Gillen was let go after Geffen Records' A&R executive John Kalodner encouraged Sykes to front the band himself.

Blue Murder's self-titled debut album was released in April 1989, and it reached number 69 on the Billboard 200 chart. The band then embarked on a tour across America and Japan. While their debut album would go on to sell an estimated 500,000 copies according to Sykes, Blue Murder's success fell short of expectations. Sykes felt Geffen Records did not properly promote the group, stating: "I think they were trying to get me and David [Coverdale] back together. They wanted me to get back with the 'winning formula'. But the wounds were too fresh. I stayed with the same label. In hindsight, I would have done better with a different label." During the recording of their sophomore effort, Franklin and Appice left Blue Murder, while Sykes put together a new line-up. At the same time, Sykes was being considered for the guitarist spot in Def Leppard. While no formal auditions took place, Sykes did jam with the group and sang backing vocals on their 1992 album Adrenalize. Ultimately the band would hire Vivian Campbell, formerly of Dio (and Sykes's successor in Whitesnake). Blue Murder, meanwhile, released their second album Nothin' But Trouble in 1993. It failed to chart, something Sykes once again attributed to Geffen Records, whom he felt "didn't do anything" to promote the record. In 1994, Blue Murder released a live album, Screaming Blue Murder: Dedicated to Phil Lynott, after which the band were dropped from their label and broke up.

There have been several attempts to reunite Blue Murder since the band's breakup. In 2019, Carmine Appice revealed that the group had rehearsed together, but Sykes wanted the band to tour under the moniker John Sykes & Blue Murder, something Appice was unwilling to do. In 2020, Appice stated that he and Sykes had once again talked about the possibility of a Blue Murder reunion, but nothing ultimately came of the conversation.

Solo career 
After parting ways with Geffen Records, Sykes signed with the Japanese branch of Mercury Records and released his first solo album Out of My Tree in 1995. Sykes released his second solo album Loveland in 1997. Mercury Records had initially requested a seven-track extended play of ballads, but Sykes ultimately decided to expand the project into a proper album. That same year he released 20th Century, a companion album to Loveland featuring heavier material. In 2000, Sykes released Nuclear Cowboy. After a failed attempt to secure a European record deal with Z Records, Sykes signed a distribution deal with Burnside Distribution in 2003, which made his solo albums available in the US for the first time. In 2005, Sykes released Bad Boy Live!, a live album featuring songs from his time with Whitesnake, Thin Lizzy and Blue Murder, as well his solo material. According to a 2021 interview with guitarist Richard Fortus, Sykes auditioned for Guns N' Roses in 2009.

During an appearance on That Metal Show in 2011, Sykes revealed he was forming a new band with drummer Mike Portnoy. However, Eddie Trunk confirmed in 2012 that the project, tentatively named "Bad Apple", was no longer moving forward. Bassist Billy Sheehan had been tapped to the band as well, but ultimately the individual schedules of all parties involved didn't line up. According to Trunk, Sykes was "not on the same timetable" as the others. Sykes was later replaced by Richie Kotzen and group became The Winery Dogs.

In 2013, Sykes revealed he was working on a new solo album. Samples from the record were released in 2014 and Sykes discussed the album in a 2017 interview with Young Guitar Magazine. In January 2019, it was announced that Sykes had signed a recording contract with Golden Robot Records with the intent of releasing his long-delayed album that same year. However, in November 2019, Sykes announced that he had ended his partnership with Golden Robot Records. On 1 January 2021, Sykes released "Dawning of a Brand New Day", his first new song in over twenty years. This was followed up by "Out Alive" in July.

Personal life 
Sykes married Jennifer Brooks-Sykes on 10 April 1989, after four years of living together. They were married until 1999. Sykes has three sons; James, John Jr. and Sean.

Style and influences 
Sykes has listed Jimmy Page, Ritchie Blackmore, Gary Moore, Michael Schenker, Uli Jon Roth, Allan Holdsworth and John McLaughlin among his biggest influences as a guitar player. He regards himself as a "blues player that plays rock". Some of the main characteristics of Sykes's playing are his fast alternate picking, doubled‐note lines, wide fret-hand vibrato, pinch harmonics and tapping. He has also been described as having a great sense of melody in his playing. In 2004, Sykes was included on Guitar World'''s list of the "100 Greatest Heavy Metal Guitarists of All Time". In 2011, he was included on Guitar Player's list of "50 Unsung Heroes of the Guitar". Guitar Player also highlighted Sykes in their 2021 article "How '80s Guitar Heroes Changed Hard Rock Forever" as one of the quintessential hard rock guitarists of the 1980s.

 Equipment 

Sykes has used a 1978 Gibson Les Paul Custom throughout most of his career. The guitar is fitted with chrome hardware (which were added at Phil Lynott's suggestion), Grover tuners and a brass nut. The guitar featured a Gibson Dirty Fingers pick-up in the bridge position, that was later swapped out for a Gibson PAF reissue. In 2006, Gibson produced a limited number of Les Pauls based on Sykes's model. The line quickly sold out. Other guitars Sykes has used over the course of his career include a sunburst 1959 Gibson Les Paul (which is featured on the cover of his 1997 album Loveland), a 1961 Fender Stratocaster, an EVH Frankenstein and a Joe Satriani model Ibanez. Sykes uses Ernie Ball strings, gauge .010 to .046, and Dunlop 1.14mm Tortex picks.

Sykes mainly uses EVH 5150 III amplifiers and cabinets. He previously used modified Marshall JCM800s for live performances. For Whitesnake's 1987 album and the first Blue Murder record, Sykes used two Mesa Boogie Coliseum heads with Mark III pre-amp sections and six 6L6 power tubes. For live performances, Sykes has used rack‐mounted chorus and delay effects. During his first stint with Thin Lizzy, Sykes used a Boss chorus pedal, which he retired after Whitesnake bassist Neil Murray complained it was too noisy.

Discography

 Solo albums 
 Out of My Tree (1995)
 Loveland (1997)
 20th Century (1997)
 Nuclear Cowboy (2000)
 Bad Boy Live! (2004)

 with Tygers of Pan Tang 
 Spellbound (1981)
 Crazy Nights (1981)
 The Cage (1982) (Tracks 8 and 10)

 with Thin Lizzy 

 Thunder and Lightning (1983)
 Life (1983)
 One Night Only (2000)

 with Whitesnake 

 Slide It In (1984)
 Whitesnake (1987)

 with Blue Murder 
 Blue Murder (1989)
 Nothin' but Trouble (1993)
 Screaming Blue Murder: Dedicated to Phil Lynott'' (1994)

Other appearances

References

Footnotes

Book sources

External links

 Official website

1959 births
Living people
20th-century British guitarists
21st-century British guitarists
English rock guitarists
English heavy metal guitarists
English rock singers
English heavy metal singers
Thin Lizzy members
Whitesnake members
Blue Murder (band) members
Badlands (UK band) members
People from Reading, Berkshire
Lead guitarists